Payton Haas (born June 9, 1979) is an American actor who is most known for starring as Mike Blondel in the first season of Flipper, alongside Jessica Alba, Brian Wimmer, and Colleen Flynn.

Haas is a 2004 graduate in Computer and Information Sciences from the University of Florida.

Career
In 1995, he played Mike Blondel in the television series Flipper.

In 1996, he played Jeremy in the television seriesThe Mystery Files of Shelby Woo.

References

External links

1979 births
Male actors from Jacksonville, Florida
20th-century American male actors
American male television actors
Living people